Ambulyx ochracea, the ochreous gliding hawkmoth, is a moth of the family Sphingidae. The species was first described by Arthur Gardiner Butler in 1885.

Dispersion  
It is found from Nepal and Sikkim, India, across central and southern China to South Korea and Japan, and south to Thailand, northern Vietnam and Taiwan.

Description 
The wingspan is 85–114 mm.

Biology 
Adults are on wing from late April to mid August in Korea. There are two generations per year.

Larvae have been recorded on Juglans regia in China and on Choerospondias fordii in India.

References

External links

Ambulyx
Moths described in 1885
Moths of Asia